Tun Sardon bin Jubir (19 March 1917 – 14 December 1985) was a Malaysian politician. He served as Minister of Health, Minister of Works and Communications and was the Yang di-Pertua Negeri (Governor) of Penang from 1975 to 1981.

Early life
Sardon was born in Rengit, Batu Pahat, Johor on 19 March 1917. His father, Haji Jubir bin Haji Mohd Amin was a plantation owner and a kathi in Singapore.

Sardon was educated at Victoria Bridge School and Raffles Institution in Singapore. At Raffles, he formed a Malay literary association with friends including Aziz Ishak, Abdul Hamid Jumat, and Ahmad Ibrahim and contributed articles on the Malays and their plight to Warta Malaya, a leading Malay newspaper in Singapore. This was done through Aziz's brother, Yusof Ishak who was already working as a journalist. Yusof later became the first President of Singapore.

After passing his Senior Cambridge examination, Tun Sardon pursued a career in Law in London and qualified as a Barrister from Lincoln's Inner Temple. He returned to Singapore in 1941 and had his practice in Singapore and later in Johor Bahru. He was called to the English Bar in 1938 at the same time as Tun Suffian Hashim who later retired as the Lord President

Political career
Tun Sardon held the post of Minister of Health until 1972. He retired from politics in 1974 and was made Ambassador to the United Nations – a post then normally associated with retired politicians. In 1975, he was appointed as Yang di-Pertua Negeri of Penang.

Family
Sardon married Toh Puan Hajjah Saadiah in 1944. They had three sons and two adopted daughters.

Death
Sardon died on 14 December 1985 and was buried at Makam Pahlawan near Masjid Negara, Kuala Lumpur.

Legacy
With the support from business and community leaders from Penang, the Tun Sardon Foundation was incorporated on 13 June 1978 as a company limited by guarantee and not having a share capital under the Companies Act 1965 to carry out charitable objects, including giving relief to the poor and needy, in particular the widows and orphans, victims of fire, floods, famine or other calamity and to those in need of moral or social rehabilitation or welfare.

Several projects and institutions were named after him, including:
 Taman Tun Sardon in Gelugor, Penang
 Jalan Tun Sardon a major road from Balik Pulau to Paya Terubong
 SMK Tun Sardon in Rengit, Johor
 Bilik Mesyuarat Tun Sardon Jubir, a conference room at Pos Malaysia National Mail Centre in Shah Alam, Selangor
 Laluan Makmal Sains Tun Sardon Jubir, a science laboratory hallway in a MARA institutional boarding school, MRSM Baling, Kedah

Honours

Honours of Penang
 As 4th Yang di-Pertua Negeri of Penang ( – )
  Knight Grand Commander (DUPN) with title Dato' Seri Utama
  Grand Master of the Order of the Defender of State

Honours of Malaysia
 :
  Commander of the Order of the Defender of the Realm (PMN) – Tan Sri (1961)
  :
  Recipient of the Malaysian Commemorative Medal (Gold) (PPM) (1965)
  Grand Commander of the Order of the Defender of the Realm (SMN) – Tun (1976)
  :
  Knight Grand Commander of the Order of the Crown of Johor (SPMJ) – Dato' (1972)
  :
  Knight Grand Commander of the Order of the Crown of Kelantan (SPMK) – Dato' (1972)

References

External links
 Tun Sardon Foundation

1917 births
1985 deaths
People from Johor
Malaysian Muslims
20th-century Malaysian lawyers
Members of the Inner Temple
Members of the Legislative Council of Singapore
Government ministers of Malaysia
Malaysian people of Malay descent
United Malays National Organisation politicians
Members of the Dewan Rakyat
Yang di-Pertua Negeri of Penang
Victoria School, Singapore alumni
Raffles Institution alumni
Grand Commanders of the Order of the Defender of the Realm
Commanders of the Order of the Defender of the Realm
Knights Grand Commander of the Order of the Crown of Johor
Health ministers of Malaysia
Transport ministers of Malaysia